Steady as she goes may refer to:

 Steady as she goes, an order for a helmsman to keep a ship's current course

In music:
 "Steady, As She Goes", a single by the rock band The Raconteurs
 Steady as She Goes (Voodoo Glow Skulls album), 2002
 Steady as She Goes (Hot Tuna album), 2011
 Steady As She Goes, an album by rock singer Jimmy "Orion" Ellis
 "Steady as She Goes", a song by Mark Collie from album Tennessee Plates
 "Steady as She Goes", a song by Shellac from Excellent Italian Greyhound

In other uses:
 Steady As She Goes: A History of the Compass Department of the Admiralty, a book by inventor Tuomas Vohlonen
 "Steady as She Goes", a Season 4 episode of Who's the Boss